People Like Us may refer to:

Film and TV 
 People Like Us (2012 film), a drama film starring Chris Pine, Elizabeth Banks, Olivia Wilde, Jon Favreau and Michelle Pfeiffer
 People Like Us (soundtrack)
 People Like Us (1980 film), an Australian film
 People Like Us (mockumentary), a British radio and TV comedy series that ran 1995–2001
 People Like Us (TV series), 2013 British reality series
 "People Like Us" (Fear the Walking Dead), a television episode
 People Like Us, a 1990 miniseries on NBC that earned a Primetime Emmy Award for Eva Marie Saint

Music
 People Like Us (band), a 1980s South African disco band
 People Like Us (musician) or Vicki Bennett (born 1967), British multimedia artist
 People Like Us (Aaron Tippin album), 2000
 "People Like Us" (Aaron Tippin song), 2000
 People Like Us (The Mamas & the Papas album), 1971
 "People Like Us" (Kelly Clarkson song), 2012
 "People Like Us", by Talking Heads from the 1986 album True Stories

Other uses 
 People Like Us (book), a 2007 book by Waleed Aly
 People Like Us (Singapore), a gay equality lobby group in Singapore